Guy Bertrand may refer to:
 Guy Bertrand (actor), played in The Crimson Permanent Assurance, a Monty Python film episode
 Guy Bertrand (broadcaster) (born 1954), French Canadian linguist and radio/TV personality
 Guy Bertrand (chemist) (born 1952), professor at UC San Diego and carbene specialist
 Guy Bertrand (lawyer), Québec lawyer and political activist
 Guy Bertrand (musician) plays the music of Limousin
 Guy Bertrand (1881–?), son of Edith Peers-Williams and George Spencer-Churchill, 8th Duke of Marlborough

See also
Bertrand (disambiguation)
Guy (disambiguation)